Walgren is a surname of Swedish origin. Notable people with the surname include:

Doug Walgren (born 1940), American attorney and politician
Gordon Walgren (1933–2018), American lawyer and politician

See also
Wahlgren
Waldren

Swedish-language surnames